Maciá is a village and municipality in Entre Ríos Province in north-eastern Argentina.

It is named after Salvador Maciá (1855-1929), a physician and provincial governor.

Population
There are 6,180 inhabitants ( DEC, 2001 ), representing a growth of 33.56% compared with 4,347 inhabitants ( DEC, 1991 ) the previous census.

National day of beekeeping
Takes place every year in the "Parque del Centenario"

References

Populated places in Entre Ríos Province